Cryptassiminea is a genus of minute operculate snails, marine gastropod mollusks or micromollusks in the family Assimineidae.

Species
Species within the genus Cryptassiminea include:

 Cryptassiminea adelaidensis Fukuda & Ponder, 2005
 Cryptassiminea glenelgensis Fukuda & Ponder, 2005
 Cryptassiminea insolata Fukuda & Ponder, 2005
 Cryptassiminea kershawi Fukuda & Ponder, 2005
 Cryptassiminea surryensis Fukuda & Ponder, 2005

References

External links

Assimineidae